A list of films produced by the Bollywood film industry in 2010. Six films made it to the top 30 list of highest grossing Hindi films at the Indian box office.

Box office collection

January–March

April–June

Ὸ

July–September

October–December

References

2010 in Indian cinema
Lists of 2010 films by country or language
2010